Goodenia rostrivalvis is a species of flowering plant in the family Goodeniaceae and is endemic to a restricted area of New South Wales. It is an ascending subshrub with egg-shaped to lance-shaped leaves with the narrower end towards the base, and thyrses or racemes of hairy yellow flowers.

Description

Taxonomy and naming
Goodenia rostrivalvis was first formally described in 1929 by Karel Domin in the Bibliotheca Botanica from specimens collected near Katoomba in 1910.

Distribution and habitat

References

rostrivalvis
Flora of New South Wales
Plants described in 1929
Endemic flora of Australia
Taxa named by Karel Domin